Pitcairnia alexanderi is a species of flowering plant in the family Bromeliaceae, endemic to eastern Ecuador, where it is known from only three subpopulations in Morona-Santiago Province. It grows in Amazonian forest habitat, and it is threatened by deforestation. It was first described by Harry Edward Luther in 1991 as Pepinia alexanderi.

References

alexanderi
Endangered plants
Endemic flora of Ecuador
Taxonomy articles created by Polbot